The 1929 Iowa Hawkeyes football team represented the University of Iowa in the 1929 college football season. This was the first year Iowa played their home games in Iowa Stadium, which was later renamed Kinnick Stadium.

Schedule

References

Iowa
Iowa Hawkeyes football seasons
Iowa Hawkeyes football